General elections were held in Tonga on 14 April 1978. Seven nobles were elected by their peers, whilst a further seven People's Representatives were publicly elected. All candidates ran as independents.

References

1978 elections in Oceania
1978 in Tonga
Elections in Tonga
Non-partisan elections
April 1978 events in Oceania